The Masonic Temple is a historic Masonic Lodge located in Muncie, Indiana. The building is now only used by the Cornerstone Center for the Arts.

History
This Masonic Temple is the third building by the Masons in the city of Muncie.  The land was acquired by the Masons to accommodate the increasing rise in membership.  Beginning in 1920, construction ended in 1926 culminating in a cost of around $1 million.  Well-known local architect Cuno Kibele was commissioned for the project.

Construction
Cornerstone Center for the Arts is in the Gothic Revival style.

The first rough estimates for the construction were around $250,000. Each organization within the fraternity was to have its own assembly room. Plans were changed, however, when the Ball brothers offered up a $150,000 donation in order to add an auditorium to the structure.  Frank C. Ball, in particular, stated that his hope was to provide a place for high-level entertainments to be held in Muncie and that he saw the construction of the new Masonic temple as a perfect place.

"Several years ago when our brothers Will and Ed were with us we talked several times of providing an auditorium for the benefit of the citizens of Muncie, where recitals, lectures, concerts, and entertainments of various kinds, of a high order, could be given. The control and management of such an auditorium was a difficult one to decide, and it was not decided until the time when the Masonic Order was planning to build a new temple. Ed, who was deeply interested in Masonry (he being Thirty-third Degree Mason), suggested that we build an auditorium in connection with the temple and place it under control of the Masonic Order."

Artwork
Gustav A. Brand created a total of twenty-two murals for the interior of the building.

Historical Significance
The construction of the Cornerstone Center for the Arts was considered a major event for a number of different reasons.  For one, the building was widely considered to be a crowning achievement in the city of Muncie.  This was due to its architectural styling. While simple, it was still considered to be one of the most beautiful and highly recognizable landmarks in the city upon completion.  Secondly, there was also a large draw in terms of the mystery and intrigue that surrounded the fraternal order of the Freemasons.  More specifically, the people's interest in the building's cornerstone garnered much attention.  The addition of the 1,600-seat auditorium to its original plans also gave the city of Muncie one of its first major entertainment venues.

It was listed on the National Register of Historic Places in 1984.

References

Masonic buildings completed in 1920
Clubhouses on the National Register of Historic Places in Indiana
Gothic Revival architecture in Indiana
Masonic buildings in Indiana
Buildings and structures in Muncie, Indiana
National Register of Historic Places in Muncie, Indiana